Durham is an unincorporated community in Walker County, in the U.S. state of Georgia.

History
Durham was first called Pittsburg; the present name is after the Durham Coal and Coke Company. A post office called Pittsburg was in operation from 1900 until 1946.

References

Unincorporated communities in Walker County, Georgia
Unincorporated communities in Georgia (U.S. state)